Patrice Lumumba (1925–1961) was the first Prime Minister of the Congo.

Lumumba may also refer to:
Lumumba (band), an Argentinian reggae band 
Lumumba (drink), a drink made with cocoa, rum and cream
Lumumba (film), a biographical film directed by Raoul Peck
"Lumumba", a 1968 tribute song by Bongi Makeba from Keep Me in Mind

People with the surname
Chokwe Lumumba, mayor of Jackson, Mississippi
Chokwe Antar Lumumba, mayor of Jackson, Mississippi
François Lumumba, Congolese politician, member of Mouvement National Congolais
Guy-Patrice Lumumba, Congolese politician
Heritier Lumumba, Australian rules footballer

People with the given name
Lumumba Di-Aping, Sudanese diplomat
Lumumba Sayers, American sportsman

See also
Congolese National Movement-Lumumba, a political party founded by Patrice Lumumba
Peoples' Friendship University of Russia, formerly known as Patrice Lumumba University